The Richmond Robins were a professional ice hockey team based in Richmond, Virginia. They were a member of the American Hockey League for five seasons from 1971–72 to 1975–76. Their cross-state rivals in the AHL were the Virginia Wings.

The Robins were previously known as the Quebec Aces, until the parent club, Philadelphia Flyers transferred the Aces to Virginia after the 1970–71 season.

Season-by-season results

Regular season

Playoffs

Notable Robins
 Bobby Taylor - Philadelphia Flyers/Tampa Bay Lightning announcer
 Dave Schultz
 Orest Kindrachuk
 Jimmy Watson
 Steve Coates

External links
AHL statistics - hockeydb.com

Ice hockey teams in Virginia
Sports in Richmond, Virginia
Defunct American Hockey League teams
Defunct ice hockey teams in the United States
Ice hockey clubs established in 1971
Ice hockey clubs disestablished in 1976
Philadelphia Flyers minor league affiliates
1971 establishments in Virginia
1976 disestablishments in Virginia